Brown envelope journalism (BEJ) is a practice whereby monetary inducement is given to journalists to make them write a positive story or kill a negative story. The name is derived from cash inducements hidden in brown envelopes and given to journalists during press briefings.

Origins

The term "brown envelope" was first coined in 1994 after the cash-for-questions-affair, a political scandal in the United Kingdom. The Guardian alleged that the owner of Harrods department store, Mohamed Al-Fayed, had paid a Member of Parliament in the House of Commons to ask a question using a brown-colored envelope for the transaction.

Practice

Brown envelope journalism is regarded as a common practice in Nigeria. Prior to the 1990s, most news publications were government owned. The Babangida regime (1985–1993) saw a rise of media activism, opposing militarised democratization and struggle for independence. The early standing of journalism as noble resulted in a lack of law or regulations. One of the effects is that the Nigerian media has become a thriving arena for sponsored stories. Journalists in Nigeria perceive brown envelope journalism practice to be unethical, and media regulatory bodies such as the Nigerian Union of Journalist (NUJ) apply a code of ethics to discourage the practice.

While the true extent of BEJ practices worldwide is unknown, research literature has been concentrated in the South East and Asia and Eastern Europe regions, as well as Latin American and African regions in recent years. In 2010, the African Communication Research journal has received around 40 submissions of research articles centered around 10 Sub-Saharan African countries.

Forms
Public relations (PR) – The practice of brown envelope journalism is sometimes described in Nigeria as PR or public relations by those who indulge in it. PR involves paying in advance for a newsworthy event to be reported by journalists.
Token of appreciation or for transport—this is monetary inducement given to journalists to gain undue favor under the guise that the bribe giver appreciates the time and mileage the journalist spent on a story.
Kola refers to offering bribes to unethical journalists.

Causes
A cause of brown envelope journalism may be the poor remuneration of journalists. Many journalists' salaries are not paid on time and bosses sometimes justify this non-payment by telling their employees to use the media platform to earn money. There are instances whereby magazines owe employees six months' salary, even when paid, many journalists still earn less than $3 per day and graduate journalist earn as little as $200 monthly. It may be difficult for journalist who are hungry or have families to feed to live on the salaries alone and neglect taking brown envelopes. In 2015, the Nigeria Union of Journalists demonstrated against This Day newspapers after salary payments were delayed for nine months. A 2013 survey study of journalists' perception on the causes of Brown Envelope Syndrome (BES) practices in Nigeria indicate that 6% of journalists interview associate poor remuneration as a cause of (BES), while 2% indicated delay in salary payments.

Another cause may be the influence of advertisers on the financial performance of media houses. Due to the revenues that accrue to media firms through advertisements, the media houses are well aware of the interest of advertisers and consider those interests in the packaging of sensitive news. Dele Olojede's Next newspapers stopped printing as a result of drop in revenues from advertisers. Next crusading stance on political issues and probe into the oil sector hurt its ad sales and paid salutatory praises on politicians.
In some broadcast television stations, sponsored news programs can reach close to 50% of news stories.

Effects
The effect of this form of journalism is that there is a shift in journalism from being a fourth estate to a publicity seeking outlet available to the highest bidder; integrity, objectivity and balance is weakened as a result and news is commercialized. It also creates an avenue for publicity seeking journalists to write commentaries that is intended to address personalities and not sensitive issues. Hence the Nigerian media is weakened and inefficient and cannot function independently of politicians and businessmen.

See also 
 Fake news
 Mass media
 Media bias
 Controversy
 Press conferences
 Journalistic scandal
 Journalism ethics and standards
 Story within a story

References

Bribery
Deception
Nigerian journalism